= Throne of Austria =

The term "Throne of Austria" may refer to

- Throne of the Holy Roman Empire from 1438 to 1806, as it was ruled by the House of Austria
- Throne of the Austrian Empire, successor to the Austrian Monarchy, and predecessor of Austria-Hungary
